Andrés Gerardo Colombo (born 30 July 1987 in Rosario, Argentina) is an Argentine former professional footballer who played as a midfielder.

Clubs
 Osimana 2009
 Deportes Concepción 2010–2012
 Deportes Quindío 2012

External links
 
 

1987 births
Living people
Argentine footballers
Association football midfielders
Deportes Concepción (Chile) footballers
Deportes Quindío footballers
Categoría Primera A players
Primera B de Chile players
Argentine expatriate footballers
Argentine expatriate sportspeople in Italy
Expatriate footballers in Italy
Argentine expatriate sportspeople in Chile
Expatriate footballers in Chile
Argentine expatriate sportspeople in Colombia
Expatriate footballers in Colombia
Footballers from Rosario, Santa Fe